Stephen I. Boardman, FRHistS, is a Scottish medieval historian. A graduate of the University of St Andrews, he held the Glenfiddich Research Fellowship and a Post-Doctoral Fellowship of the British Academy at St Andrews before being appointed Mackie Lecturer in  History at the University of Aberdeen in 1995. He subsequently moved to the University of Edinburgh, where he is now Professor of Medieval Scottish History. Boardman's work focuses on kingship and the nobility in the later Middle Ages, and he has completed work on Kings Robert II and Robert III of Scotland, as well as Clan Campbell. The former is the only work to deal specifically with those monarchs.

Select bibliography
 The Early Stewart Kings: Robert II and Robert III, 1371-1406. Tuckwell Press. 1996
 Editor. The Exercise of Power in Scotland, 1250-1500. Four Courts Press. 2003
 ‘Survival and revival: late medieval Scotland’ - J. Wormald (editor), The Oxford Illustrated History of Scotland. Oxford University Press. 2005
 The Campbells, 1250-1500. Birlinn Press. 2005
 ‘The Gaelic world and the early Stewart court’ - D. Broun and M. MacGregor (editors), Miorun Mor nan Gall, The Great Ill-Will of the Lowlander: Lowland Perceptions of the Scottish Highlands. Stornoway. 2006

References

External links
University of Edinburgh staff page

Academics of the University of Edinburgh
Alumni of the University of St Andrews
Fellows of the Royal Historical Society
Living people
20th-century Scottish historians
Academics of the University of Aberdeen
Year of birth missing (living people)
21st-century Scottish historians